The Cleveland Blues were a professional baseball franchise that operated in the National League (NL), a "major" league, from 1879 until 1884. They were organized by businessmen William Hollinger, and J. Ford Evans in 1878 as the Forest Citys, and played a season as an independent team. The NL expanded from six teams to eight before the 1879 season, and the Forest Citys accepted an invitation to join the league. Evans became their president and stayed in that capacity until C. H. Bulkeley assumed the role in 1882. In their six seasons in the NL, the team never finished higher than third place in the standings. They played their home games in League Park.

For their first season in the NL, the franchise (now named the Blues due to their dark blue uniforms) employed Jim McCormick as the manager as well as the ace of their pitching staff. Cleveland did not fare well, winning just 27 games against 55 losses, with a league-low .223 batting average. The 1880 season was better, however, as the team increased its win total to 47 against 37 losses and a tie, McCormick winning a league-leading 45 of those victories. Over the next two seasons, the team changed the on-field leadership often; employing Mike McGeary and John Clapp as player-managers in 1881, and Fred Dunlap in 1882. The changes did not prove effective as the team was unable to finish higher than fifth place during that span. The team had their best record and highest win total in 1883 under manager Frank Bancroft. On September 13, 1883, Hugh Daily threw the franchise's lone no-hitter.

An upstart baseball league was created in 1884 by Henry Lucas called the Union Association (UA). Several member of the Blues' signed contracts with teams in the UA despite being subject to the reserve clause: including star players McCormick, Dunlap, and Jack Glasscock. These moves caused the Blues to become financially unstable. However, the franchise was able to secure a deal with the league for a better share of gate receipts. This deal was not enough for the franchise to profit, and Bulkeley sold the team to Lucas for $2,500 ($ current dollar adjustment) following the conclusion of the 1884 season.

Players

References

Bibliography

External links
Baseball Reference

Major League Baseball all-time rosters